The Volfefe Index was a stock market index of volatility in market sentiment for US Treasury bonds caused by tweets by former President Donald Trump.

Bloomberg News observed Volfefe was created due to the statistical significance of Trump tweets on bond prices. ABC News Online posited Volfefe could help analyze interest rate risk in the face of "unpredictable" activity on social media by Trump.

Etymology
The name "Volfefe" is a portmanteau of volatility and  the "covfefe" tweet by Trump.

Creation
Volfefe was launched by JPMorgan Chase on September 9, 2019.

Methods
In forming the basis of the methodology behind Volfefe, JPMorgan Chase used software to analyse the corpus of Trump's tweets. 14,000 tweets were used in the analysis to form the initial projections for their software. Their analysts determined that there were direct correlations between tweets and subsequent market movements. These market movements were most notably evidenced when the tweet specifically references financial matters including the US Federal Reserve. The tweets issued during the working day of the New York Stock Exchange were more likely to cause a change in market sentiment; however, it was noted that the tweets can come at any time of day and thus have an effect on markets around the world. Key words in tweets often include "China", "billion", "products", "Democrats", "great", "dollars", "tariffs" and "trade".

Analysis
Bloomberg News noted, "JPMorgan’s 'Volfefe Index,' named after Trump’s mysterious covfefe tweet from May 2017, suggests that the president’s electronic musings are having a statistically significant impact on Treasury yields."

ABC News Online commented JP Morgan created Volfefe, "to measure how much impact Mr Trump's unpredictable tweets have on US interest rates".

See also
 Big Mac Index
 Black swan theory
 Economic Policy Uncertainty Index
 Greed and fear
 Hemline index
 Market trend
 Probability of default
 S&P/ASX 200 VIX
 SKEW
 Twitter diplomacy
 Use of Twitter by public figures
 VIX
 Waffle House Index

References

External links

 
 
 Trump Tweets at CNN
 List of Donald Trump deleted tweets on Factbase
 Trump Twitter archive Searchable database
 

Stock market
Behavioral finance
Mathematical finance
Donald Trump and social media
2019 beginnings
2010s in mass media
Computer-related introductions in 2019
E-government in the United States
Mass media-related controversies in the United States
Social media
Twitter accounts
2010s in Internet culture
2010s in American politics